Los Angeles is the most populous city in California and the second most populous in the United States.

Los Angeles may also refer to:

Places

Panama 
 Los Ángeles, Chiriquí, a corregimiento
 Los Ángeles, Los Santos, another corregimiento

Spain 
 Cerro de los Ángeles, a hill
 Los Ángeles (Madrid), a neighborhood

United States

California 
 Greater Los Angeles, the metropolitan area
 Los Angeles County, California
 Los Angeles Basin, the coastal plain
 Los Angeles River
 Los Angeles Street, downtown Los Angeles

Texas 
 Los Angeles, Willacy County, Texas, a census-designated place
 Los Angeles, La Salle County, Texas, an unincorporated community

Elsewhere 
 Los Ángeles, Catamarca, in Argentina
 Los Ángeles, Chile, the capital of the Chilean province of Bío Bío
 Bahía de los Ángeles a bay located along the east side of the Baja California Peninsula of Mexico
 Los Ángeles, South Caribbean Coast Autonomous Region, in Nicaragua
 Los Angeles, Bohol, a barangay in the Philippines
 Los Ángeles, a district in the canton of San Ramón, Costa Rica

Music 
 Los Ángeles (band), a Spanish pop group

Albums
 Los Angeles (Flying Lotus album), 2008
 Los Angeles (The Brilliant Green album), 2001
 Los Angeles (X album), 1980
 Los Ángeles (album), a 2017 album by Rosalía

Songs

 "Los Angeles" (Frank Black song), released in 1993
 Los Angeles, a song by Sugarcult from the 2006 album Lights Out
 Los Angeles, a song by Blink-182 from the 2016 album California
 Los Angeles, a song by X from the 1980 album Los Angeles
 Los Angeles, a 2015 song by Amanda Grace

Sports 
 Los Angeles Angels, professional baseball team of Major League Baseball
 Los Angeles Chargers, professional American football team of the National Football League
 Los Angeles Clippers, professional basketball team of the National Basketball Association
 Los Angeles Dodgers, professional baseball team of Major League Baseball
 Los Angeles FC, professional soccer team of Major League Soccer 
 Los Angeles Galaxy, commonly known as LA Galaxy, professional soccer team of Major League Soccer
 Los Angeles Kings, professional ice hockey team of the National Hockey League
 Los Angeles Lakers, professional basketball team of the National Basketball Association
 Los Angeles Rams,  professional American football team of the National Football League
 Los Angeles Sparks, professional basketball team of the Women's National Basketball Association

Transportation 
 Los Angeles International Airport, the primary airport serving the Greater Los Angeles Area
 Los Angeles-class submarine, a boat class

Other uses 
 Los Angeles (magazine), a monthly magazine devoted to the city of Los Angeles

See also 
 City of Los Angeles (disambiguation)
 L.A. (disambiguation)